Handel's Homemade Ice Cream is an ice cream company franchise founded by Alice Handel in 1945 in Youngstown, Ohio.  As of December 2022, the company is operating 90 corporate and franchise stores in 11 states. Today, it is owned by Leonard Fisher and maintains a corporate headquarters in Canfield, Ohio.

History
Handel's Ice Cream began when Alice Handel started serving ice cream from her husband's gas station in Youngstown, Ohio in the summer of 1945. The first batches were made using fresh fruit she picked from her own backyard, with old fashioned recipes. Handel's includes locations in Ohio, Arizona, Alabama, California, Indiana, Nevada, Oregon, Pennsylvania, North Carolina, Texas and Utah. The menu also expanded to over 150 flavors of homemade ice cream.[3] Its success has been reported in various publications including the Travel Channel, which recognized Handel's as "One of the Best Ice Cream Parlors in the Country."

Recognition
Its success has been reported in various publications including the Travel Channel, which recognized Handel's as "One of the Best Ice Cream Parlors in the Country." In July 2002, USA Today rated it as one of the top-ten best ice cream businesses in the country. In 2020, Handel's was named as one of the top 500 franchises by Entrepreneur Magazines Franchise 500 ranking. The original stand—still located in Youngstown, Ohio—has been quoted as “The Busiest Ice Cream Stand in America” by Ohio Restaurant News.

It has been described by Ohio Restaurant News as "The Busiest Ice Cream Stand in America". Chocolatier Magazine called Handel's "One of the Best Ice Creams in America." In 2006, National Geographic named Handel's the #1 ice cream in its 10 Best of Everything book. Handel's success has also been documented by People Magazine, U.S. News & World Report, and the book Everyone Loves Ice Cream.

See also
 List of frozen yogurt companies
 List of ice cream brands

Notes

External links
 

Ice cream parlors in the United States
Frozen yogurt businesses
Fast-food chains of the United States
Regional restaurant chains in the United States
Companies based in Ohio
Youngstown, Ohio
Restaurants established in 1945
Food and drink companies established in 1969
Economy of the Eastern United States
Ice cream brands
1945 establishments in Ohio